Granville Township (listed as Granville (village) on the US government census Web site) is one of the fourteen townships of Mercer County, Ohio, United States.  Based on the 2010 census, the population in 2011 was estimated at 5,662.

Geography
Located in the southern part of the county, it borders the following townships:
Butler Township - north
Marion Township - east
Wabash Township, Darke County - southeast
Allen Township, Darke County - southwest
Gibson Township - west
Recovery Township - northwest

Two incorporated villages are located in Granville Township: part of Burkettsville in the south, and St. Henry in the north.

Name and history
Granville Township was established in 1837. The only other Granville Township in Ohio is in Licking County.

Government
The township is governed by a three-member board of trustees, who are elected in November of odd-numbered years to a four-year term beginning on the following January 1. Two are elected in the year after the presidential election and one is elected in the year before it. There is also an elected township fiscal officer, who serves a four-year term beginning on April 1 of the year after the election, which is held in November of the year before the presidential election. Vacancies in the fiscal officership or on the board of trustees are filled by the remaining trustees.

References

External links
County website

Townships in Mercer County, Ohio
Townships in Ohio